Koppes is a surname. Notable people with the surname include:

Johannes Joseph Koppes (1843–1918), Luxembourgian Roman Catholic bishop
Michele Koppes, Dutch professor
Peter Koppes (born 1955), Australian guitarist

See also
Koppe (surname)
Kopper (surname)